Maglan (also known as Unit 212 or Sayeret Maglan) is a sayeret (reconnaissance) unit of the Israeli Defense Forces, which specializes in operating behind enemy lines and deep in enemy territory using advanced technologies and weaponry. Though Maglan is part of the IDF's Commando Brigade, its operators undergo basic training with the Paratroopers Brigade.

The unit's name means "Ibis" (In Hebrew: Maglan). According to one officer, "Maglan is a bird that knows how to adapt in every situation." A relatively new unit, Maglan was founded in 1986, but its existence was only declassified in 2006.

History
Very little is known about the unit, only that the force performs top secret operations behind enemy lines, deep within hostile territory. The IDF keeps Maglan's designated missions a secret and gives no information about it or the operations in which the unit takes part. The secretive unit has clocked-up countless hours of high-risk operations conducted well behind enemy lines—most of which have never been declassified.

Like Sayeret Matkal, although the operators in the unit wear a red beret, brown combat boots and conduct basic training at one of the paratroopers' bases, they are not part of the Paratroop Brigade.

Much like Sayeret Matkal, Maglan reports to the IDF's General Staff and not to one of its regional commands.

The unit was active in southern Lebanon during the South Lebanon conflict, and carried out numerous successful missions against Hezbollah. It took part in hundreds of missions in the West Bank and Gaza Strip during the Second Intifada, particularly in carrying out arrests of terror suspects. During the 2006 Lebanon War, the unit took part in many operations and achieved great success. On 19 July a force from the unit seized a fortified Hezbollah dugout adjacent to the Shaked post; two IDF soldiers and five Hezbollah operatives were killed in the battle. Operation Beach Boys, later on in the war, saw the unit embedded along the western coastal strip of Lebanon where they destroyed 150 Hezbollah targets, forty of which were rocket launchers. Maglan oversaw the destruction of command sites, trucks, caches of ammunition and infrastructure. Their activities reduced rocket fire on Israel's northern towns by about 40%.

During Operation Protective Edge, the unit took part in combat in the Gaza Strip. On 30 July 2014, three Maglan soldiers, St.-Sgt. Matan Gotlib (21), St.-Sgt. Omer Hay (21) and St.-Sgt. Guy Algranati (20) were killed and 15 others wounded by explosions in a booby-trapped tunnel shaft dug by Hamas. It was awarded a Chiefs of Staff Citation for its activities in Operation Protective Edge in 2015.

On July 12, 2018, Maglan snipers won the IDF International Sniping Competition, overcoming units such as Sayeret Matkal, the US Navy SEALs and US Army Sniper School.

On August 2, 2020 the unit ambushed and killed four militants in southern Golan Heights while the latter were deploying IEDs at the security fence.

Training

Recruits train extensively for 18 months in what is considered to be one of the most challenging training courses in the IDF. The trainees first go through 6 months of basic and advanced infantry training within the Paratroopers Brigade, including a parachuting course. The soldiers then must complete a 60 km (37 mi) beret march (Hebrew: Masa Kumta) to Maglan's base to continue their training. The recruits go through courses in navigation, camouflage, observation, specialized warfare, and special operational devices. Physical standards are high, with candidates required to carry equipment weighing about 70% of their body mass over several dozen kilometers. About two-thirds of the candidates drop out due to the harsh nature of the program.

Each recruit also goes through the IDF's commander's course. Towards the end of training, the recruits learn specific skills according to the speciality of their unit. The end of training ceremony is held secretly and closed to the public.

Notable members
 Naftali Bennett
 Yaniv Iczkovits
 Reshef Levi
 Mossi Raz
 Tal Russo
 Dror Weinberg

See also
 Battle of Maroun al-Ras

References

Military units and formations of Israel
Special forces of Israel
Covert organizations
Military units and formations established in 1986